Satya Narayan Pradhan better known as S.N. Pradhan or Satya Pradhan is the current Director General of Narcotics Control Bureau and an IPS officer of 1988 batch from Jharkhand cadre.

He is the former Joint Secretary, Ministry of Development of North Eastern Region. While Pradhan is a native of Odisha he is born in Patna, Bihar.

He had also served as Senior IPS officer from Odisha State.

Pradhan earlier worked as Assistant Director and Deputy Director at the Sardar Vallabhbhai Patel National Police Academy, Hyderabad and trained 6 batches of IPS officers.

Prior to join SVPNPA he worked as Superintendent of Police and Additional Director General of Police (Law & Order) in various districts of Bihar state.

Decorations
 President's Police Medal for Distinguished Service - Received in 2012
 Police Medal for Meritorious Service - Received in 2006
 President’s Police Medal for Gallantry - Received in

Awards
Queen's Award 2008 for Innovation in Policing by the Government of UK

References

Indian Police Service officers
Year of birth missing (living people)
Living people